Leptosiphon ambiguus (syn. Linanthus ambiguus), the serpentine linanthus, is a low annual plant with needle-like leaves and a vivid lavender flower.  It grows in serpentine soils and is an endemic threatened species of the Bay Area in California.

External links
Jepson Manual Online: Leptosiphon ambiguus
Calflora Database: Leptosiphon ambiguus
UC Photos gallery − Leptosiphon ambiguus

ambiguus
Endemic flora of California
Endemic flora of the San Francisco Bay Area
Natural history of the California chaparral and woodlands
~
Threatened flora of California
Flora without expected TNC conservation status